The Canavieiras Extractive Reserve is a coastal marine extractive reserve in the state of Bahia, Brazil.

Location

The Canavieiras Extractive Reserve is divided between the municipalities of Belmonte (2.65%), Canavieiras (11.51%) and Una (0.38%) in Bahia and a strip of coastal waters.

History

The Canavieiras Extractive Reserve was created by presidential decree on 5 June 2006.
It is administered by the Chico Mendes Institute for Biodiversity Conservation.
It became part of the Central Atlantic Forest Ecological Corridor, created in 2002.
It is classed as IUCN protected area category VI (protected area with sustainable use of natural resources).
An extractive reserve is an area used by traditional extractive populations whose livelihood is based on extraction, subsistence agriculture and small-scale animal raising.
Its basic objectives are to protect the livelihoods and culture of these people and to ensure sustainable use of natural resources.

The deliberative council was created on 3 September 2009.
On 16 December 2009 the Instituto Nacional de Colonização e Reforma Agrária (INCRA: National Institute for Colonization and Agrarian Reform) recognised the reserve as supporting 1,300 families, who would qualify for PRONAF support.
On 5 December 2015 ICMBio granted the Associação Mãe dos Extrativistas da Reserva Extrativista de Canavieira (AMEX) the right of use for 20 years.
A profile of the beneficiary families was published on 5 August 2016.

Notes

Sources

Marine extractive reserves of Brazil
Protected areas of Bahia
2006 establishments in Brazil